A timing belt is a non-slipping mechanical drive belt and the term may refer to either:

 Toothed belt, a flexible belt with teeth moulded onto its inner surface
 Timing belt (camshaft), a toothed belt used to drive the camshaft(s) within an internal combustion engine (a specific application of a toothed belt)